John Julian Hamre (born July 3, 1950) is a specialist in international studies, a former Washington government official and President and CEO of the Center for Strategic and International Studies, a position he has held with that think tank since 2000.

Early life and education
Hamre is the son of Melvin Sanders and Ruth Lucile (Larson) Hamre.  He attended primary and secondary school in Clark, South Dakota, graduating from the Clark Public High School in May 1968. He earned a B.A. (with high distinction) in political science and economics from Augustana College in Sioux Falls, South Dakota (1972). The following year he was a Rockefeller Fellow at Harvard Divinity School.  He earned an M.A. (1976) and Ph.D. (1978) with distinction from the Johns Hopkins University School of Advanced International Studies (SAIS). His doctoral thesis was entitled Congressional Dissent and American Foreign Policy: Constitutional War-Making in the Vietnam Years.

Federal government service

Hamre served in the Congressional Budget Office (1978–1984), where he became its deputy assistant director for national security and international affairs. In that position, he oversaw analysis and other support for committees in both the House of Representatives  and the Senate. In the 1980s, he worked for ten years at the Senate Armed Services Committee. During that time, he was primarily responsible for the oversight and evaluation of procurement, research and development programs, defense budget issues, and relations with the Senate Appropriations Committee.

Hamre was DoD Comptroller (1993–1997) and Deputy Secretary of Defense (1997–1999), both under President Bill Clinton.

The Senate appointed Hamre (2001) to the Commission on the Future of the United States Aerospace Industry.

Post-Federal Government Service 
Hamre worked on the Obama transition team.  He is chairman of the Defense Policy Board. Hamre's continued involvement in the defense establishment has put him on the short list for the position of Secretary of Defense multiple times, including during the formation of the first term of the Obama administration and most recently after the president's re-election in 2012.

In July 2022, Hamre helped found a group of U.S. business and policy leaders who share the goal of constructively engaging with China in order to improve U.S.-China relations.

Honors

In 2008, the Norwegian King Harald V appointed Hamre Commander of the Royal Norwegian Order of Merit for his efforts "to promote collaboration between Norwegian and American politicians, authorities and researchers".

Publications (partial list)

References

External links

|-

1950 births
Living people
American people of Norwegian descent
People from Watertown, South Dakota
People from Clark, South Dakota
Augustana University alumni
Harvard Divinity School alumni
Paul H. Nitze School of Advanced International Studies alumni
International relations scholars
American political scientists
Clinton administration personnel
Employees of the United States Congress
Obama administration personnel
People from Bethesda, Maryland
United States Under Secretaries of Defense
United States Deputy Secretaries of Defense
American chief executives
CSIS people